Home is the fourth studio album released on February 26, 2002 by the American soul and gospel singer Shirley Murdock. The album peaked at #9 on Billboard's Top Gospel Albums chart on March 16, 2002.

Track listing

Personnel

Adapted from AllMusic

Shirley Murdock – lead vocals
Solid Rock Fire Choir – backing vocals, choir
Cheryl Dover – backing vocals, choir
Lee Priestly – backing vocals, choir
Rhonda Stevens – backing vocals, choir
Jodi Barber – backing vocals
Kelvin Lee – backing vocals
Teresa Chadwick – backing vocals
Julia Givhan – backing vocals
Belinda Munro – backing vocals
Zan Goss – backing vocals
Charles Q. Price – backing vocals
Darwin Hobbs – backing vocals
Deidre Wright – backing vocals
Tanjala Wright – backing vocals
Juanita Wynn – backing vocals
Lejuene Thompson – backing vocals
Kim Washington – backing vocals
William Murdock, Jr. – backing vocals
Corey "Ze" Williams, Jr. – backing vocals
Smokie Norful – vocal arrangement
Gary Crawford – vocal arrangement
Kayla Parker – vocal arrangement
Joe Archie – keyboards
Darrell Freeman – bass
Brian Moore – drums
The Nashville String Machine – strings
Carlos Pennell – guitar
Lester Troutman – drum programming, drums
Lloyd Barry – string arrangements
Alex Bond – assistant engineer
Kevin Bond – arranger, assistant engineer, engineer, keyboards, mixing, producer, programming, backing vocals
Toni Bond – production coordination, project coordinator
Ralph Cacciurri – engineer, mixing
Dale Degroat – drum programming, keyboards, mixing, producer, backing vocals
T.D. Jakes – executive producer
Ken Pennell – executive producer
Sanchez Harley – producer
Ricardo Hicks – engineer
Roger Moody – assistant engineer
Ken Love – mastering
Darren Noble – guitar, mixing, producer
Brian "Bee" Porter – engineer, mixing
John Jaszcz – mixing
Geoff Koval – mixing
Ray Winer – mixing
Ray Winters – mixing
Russ Harrington – Photography

References

2011 albums
Shirley Murdock albums
Gospel albums by American artists